Hollis is an unincorporated community in Calhoun County, Mississippi, United States.

Hollis was formerly home to a school prior to it being relocated to the New Liberty community.

A post office operated under the name Hollis from 1890 to 1921.

References

Unincorporated communities in Calhoun County, Mississippi
Unincorporated communities in Mississippi